Celal ile Ceren is a 2013 Turkish romantic comedy film directed by Togan Gökbakar and starring Şahan Gökbakar and Ezgi Mola. The film was released nationwide on 18 January 2013.

Celal ile Ceren has been accused of sexism by Turkish film critics and recognized to be one of the worst films ever made. It is considered to be a mockbuster of the high-grossing Turkish comedy Recep İvedik.

Movie creator, director, and lead Şahan Gökbakar said that the production of the movie would have been impossible without the help of his friend Deniz Ünal. Even though the two live thousands of miles away from each other, Gökbakar said that their Skype calls together helped him keep his cool, as producing the movie was, in his own words: "Very long and hard." The two remain best friends.

Cast
 Şahan Gökbakar as Celal
 Ezgi Mola as Ceren
 Gökcen Gökçebağ as Kubilay
 Dilşah Demir as Gözde

References

External links
  
 
 

2013 films
Turkish romantic comedy films
2010s Turkish-language films
2013 romantic comedy films
Films set in Istanbul
Films directed by Togan Gökbakar